Beavoha is a town and commune in southwest Madagascar. It belongs to the district of Betioky, which is a part of Atsimo-Andrefana Region. The population of the commune was estimated to be approximately 8,000 in 2001 commune census.

Only primary schooling is available. The majority 70% of the population of the commune are farmers, while an additional 28% receives their livelihood from raising livestock. The most important crops are beans and onions; also peanuts are an important agricultural product. Services provide employment for 2% of the population.

References and notes 

Populated places in Atsimo-Andrefana